The 2017–18 Indian cricket season was the 125th cricket season since the commencement of first-class cricket in India. The season started early in September 2017 and ended in March 2018. A first-class match between India Red and India Green in Duleep Trophy marked the beginning of the season. The season included tours from Australia, New Zealand A, New Zealand and Sri Lanka.

Ranji Trophy matches, unlike in the previous season, were played on a home and away basis. The number of matches were reduced from 8 to 6 for each team in league stage,  as 28 teams were divided into 4 groups of 7 teams each. Initial plans to scrap the Duleep trophy were reversed by the BCCI and the tournament is now played using pink ball.

September

Duleep Trophy 

 advanced to Finals

Australia in India

New Zealand A in India

October

Ranji Trophy

Group stage 
Group A

Group B

Group C

Group D

Knockout stage

Vinoo Mankad Trophy Zonal League

North Zone 

 winner of North zone

South Zone 

 winner of South zone

Central Zone 

 winner of Central zone

West Zone 

 winner of West zone

East Zone 

 winner of East zone

Col C K Nayudu Trophy

Elite Group 
Elite Group A

Elite Group B

Elite Group C

Plate Group 
Plate Group A

Plate Group B

Plate Knockout Stage

Knockout stage

New Zealand in India

Vinoo Mankad Trophy Inter Zonal League 

 Winner of Vinoo Mankad Trophy Inter Zonal League

November

Women's U-19 One Day league

Zonal Stage 
South Zone

 Qualified for Super League

West Zone

 Qualified for Super League

East Zone

 Qualified for Super League

North Zone

 Qualified for Super League

Central Zone

 Qualified for Super League

North East and Bihar

 Qualified for Super League

Super League Stage 
Super League Group A

 Qualified for knockout stage

Super League Group B

 Qualified for knockout stage

Knockout stage

Cooch Behar Trophy

Group stage 
Group A

Group B

Group C

Group D

Knockout stage

Sri Lanka in India

Men's U-19 Challenger Trophy 

 advanced to Finals

December

Women's One Day League

Elite Group 
Elite Group A

Elite Group B

Plate Group 
Plate Group A

Plate Group B

Plate Group C

Plate Knockout Stage

Elite Super League

January

Women's Challenger Trophy 

 The top two teams qualified for the finals

Syed Mushtaq Ali Trophy

Zonal Stage

North Zone

 Advanced to Super League

South Zone 

 Advanced to Super League

Central Zone

 Advanced to Super League

West Zone

 Advance to Super League

East Zone

 Advanced to Super League

Super League Stage 

Super League Group A

 Advanced to Final

Super League Group B

 Advanced to Final

Final

February

Vijay Hazare Trophy

Group stage 
Group A

Points table

Group B

Points table

Group C

Points table

Group D

Points table

Knockout stage

March

Deodhar Trophy 

 advanced to Finals

Australia women in India

Irani Cup

Senior Women's Inter Zonal Three Day League

Women's Tri-Nation Series 

 Advanced to Finals

April

England women in India

References 

Indian cricket seasons from 2000–01